Qinglong County is a county in the southwest of Guizhou province, China. It is under the administration of the Qianxinan Buyei and Miao Autonomous Prefecture. It has a population of 234,162 as of 2020, 56% belonging to ethnic minorities (2019 data). Qinglong is named after the Qinglong mountain, before 1941 it was called Annang County (安南县). The county was a frontline of the 1854–1873 Miao Rebellions.

Administrative divisions 
Qinglong County has 4 subdistricts, 8 towns, 3 townships, and 1 ethnic township under its jurisdiction:

Climate

References

External links

County-level divisions of Guizhou
Qianxinan Buyei and Miao Autonomous Prefecture